Ƹ (minuscule: ƹ) is a letter of the Latin alphabet.

Although it looks like a reversed ezh (Ʒ), it is based on the Arabic letter . (Unicode, however, refers to it expressly as "reversed ezh.")

References

Bibliography
 

Latin-script letters